The Lewiston–Queenston Bridge, also known as the Queenston–Lewiston Bridge, is an arch bridge that crosses the Niagara River gorge just south of the Niagara Escarpment. The bridge was officially opened on November 1, 1962. It is an international bridge between the United States and Canada. It connects Interstate 190 in the town of Lewiston, New York to Highway 405 in the community of Queenston, Ontario.  The Lewiston–Queenston Bridge is a twin of the Rainbow Bridge at Niagara Falls and designed by Richard (Su Min) Lee.

Customs plazas are located on both ends of the bridge, with tolls only being charged on entering Canada ($5.00 USD or $6.50 CAD per passenger automobile). The bridge accepts E-ZPass electronic toll collection and houses the second Canadian E-ZPass collection facility, after the nearby Peace Bridge. Also, two duty-free stores are located between the two plazas.

The bridge permits no pedestrians, but licensed taxi service is permitted. The Lewiston–Queenston Bridge lacks expedited border clearance facilities for NEXUS and FAST card holders traveling from the United States into Canada, but does have a NEXUS lane for travel into the United States.

Gantries have lights indicating the direction of traffic as the lanes are reversible. Speed limit is posted in kilometres and miles per hour ( limit) along the bridge. Canadian and United States flags fly at the midpoint on the south side of the bridge.

Customs clearance and tolls
There is customs clearance on either side of the bridge.  The toll for use of the bridge is payable upon entering Canada only.
 Canada-bound:
 10 customs booths for cars/RVs
 5 customs booths for trucks
 Dedicated Bus Processing Lane
 parking area for trucks for inspections
 helipad
 6 toll booths
 US-bound:
 6 customs booths for cars/buses/RVs
 3 customs booths for trucks
 parking area for trucks for inspections

Passenger vehicles pay a toll only when entering Canada from the US. The cost is $5.00 USD or $6.50 CAD, as of August 1, 2022, payable by cash or E-ZPass.

High mast lighting is used on the Canadian side, with regular light standards used for bridge and the US side.

Previous suspension bridges

The first Queenston-Lewiston Bridge was built in 1851 by engineer Edward Serrell and wrecked by wind in 1864 (or 1854). Some of the cables were still in place as late as 1895. The suspension bridge design was unusual because the cables were attached to the cliff with only small towers.

A second bridge called the Queenston-Lewiston Bridge, a suspension bridge was later constructed. The suspension bridge was dismantled in 1963 after the current bridge was completed and opened.

Reminders of the earlier bridge are still visible in the area. First is two columns that lie within the Earl W. Brydges Artpark State Park. Second is the original plaque, now located midspan alongside the road, right at the border between the two countries. The plaque is flanked by a US and a Canadian flag.

The supports are part of Owen Morrell's Omega, a steel sculpture and observation platform added in 1981. Two columns remain on the Canadian side at the foot of York Street in a wooded area now known as York Park.

Plane crash
On December 1, 1961, while the bridge was under construction, an F-100 fighter (variously reported as belonging to the United States Air Force or Air National Guard) caught fire just after taking off from a base near Niagara Falls, New York. To protect people in the city, the pilot steered it into the Niagara River gorge before safely ejecting; but this aimed it near the construction site.

Border crossings
The crossing is the fourth-busiest on the Canada–United States border, with delays of up to two hours. It is on the most direct route connecting the US Interstate system to Toronto and Detroit. Canada replaced its border inspection facilities in 2011. The United States continues to use its original 1962 border inspection facilities; however, in 2016, it announced plans to spend $50million to upgrade them.  Both facilities are open 24 hours per day, 365 days per year.  All commercial vehicles crossing between the US and Canada in the Niagara Falls area must use this crossing.

See also
 
 
 
 
 List of Canada–United States border crossings
 List of crossings of the Niagara River
 List of bridges in Canada
 List of bridges in the United States by height

References

External links
 
 Niagara Falls Bridge Commission
 Images from the Niagara Historic Digital Collections
 Live Traffic Camera of Lewiston Queenston Bridge
 Lewiston Queenston Bridge Collection of Images Niagara Falls Public Library (Ont.)

1962 establishments in New York (state)
1962 establishments in Ontario
Buildings and structures in Niagara-on-the-Lake
Bridges completed in 1962
Bridges in Niagara County, New York
Bridges on the Interstate Highway System
Bridges over the Niagara River
Canada–United States border crossings
Canada–United States bridges
Interstate 90
Open-spandrel deck arch bridges in Canada
Open-spandrel deck arch bridges in the United States
Road bridges in New York (state)
Road bridges in Ontario
Roads with a reversible lane
Steel bridges in Canada
Steel bridges in the United States
Toll bridges in Canada
Toll bridges in New York (state)
Tolled sections of Interstate Highways
Transport in the Regional Municipality of Niagara